William of Orange usually refers to either:
William the Silent, William I, (1533–1584), Prince of Orange, leader of the Dutch Revolt, founder of the House Orange-Nassau and the United Provinces as a state 
William III of England, William III of Orange-Nassau, William II of Scotland, (1650–1702) stadtholder of the Dutch Republic

William of Orange may also refer to:

Middle Ages
 Saint William of Gellone (755 – c. 812), courtier of Charlemagne who defeated the Saracens at Orange
 William (Bishop of Orange) (d. 1098), a Bishop who joined the First Crusade

William of Orange in the House of Baux and the House of Chalon-Arlay
 William I of Baux (c. 1155 – 1219)
 William II of Baux (died 1239)
 William III of Baux (died 1256)
 William VII of Chalon-Arlay (c. 1415 – 1478)

United Provinces of the Netherlands
 William II, Prince of Orange (1626–1650), stadtholder of the United Provinces of the Netherlands from 1647
 William IV, Prince of Orange (1711–1751), first hereditary stadtholder of the Netherlands
 William V, Prince of Orange (1748–1806), last Stadtholder of the Dutch Republic and leader of the conservative faction

Kingdom of the Netherlands
 William I of the Netherlands (1772–1843), also known as William Frederik of Orange-Nassau or William VI of Orange before his accession
 William II of the Netherlands (1792–1849), King of the Netherlands and Grand Duke of Luxembourg
 William III of the Netherlands (1817–1890), King of the Netherlands and Grand Duke of Luxembourg
 William, Prince of Orange (1840-1879), eldest son of William III, died before his father
 Willem-Alexander, King of the Netherlands (b. 1967), King of the Netherlands, eldest child of former Queen Beatrix

Other
William of Orange (pigeon), pigeon used by British military in Battle of Arnhem in September 1944

See also
Princes of Orange

Human name disambiguation pages